Capo Granitola Lighthouse is an active lighthouse located on the 
south-western headland south of Mazzara del Vallo a region well known for its Almadraba. The tower is well placed in the nearby archeological park Cave di Cusa and is located in the municipality of Campobello di Mazara, Sicily on the Strait of Sicily.

Description
The tower, decorated with local stone, and the lantern are painted white; the lantern dome grey metallic. The lighthouse is completely automated and managed by the Marina Militare with the identification code number 3010 E.F.

See also
 List of lighthouses in Italy

References

External links

 Servizio Fari Marina Militare

Lighthouses in Italy
Buildings and structures in Sicily